Venusberg may refer to:
 Venusberg (mythology), in Teutonic myth, a subterranean temple of Venus
 Venusberg, Saxony, a municipality in Saxony, Germany
 Venusberg (novel), a 1932 novel by Anthony Powell
 Venusberg is also a locality in the city of Bonn.
 Venusberg (film), a 1963 West German film